James Lee Skaggs (born January 3, 1940, in Wetumka, Oklahoma) is a former professional American football offensive lineman in the National Football League who played ten seasons for the Philadelphia Eagles.  He played college football at the University of Washington and was drafted in the tenth round of the 1962 NFL Draft.  Skaggs was also selected in the 12th round of the 1962 AFL Draft by the Oakland Raiders.

In the early 1960s, Skaggs worked construction for O.J. Reiner Construction Company in Santa Maria, California.

1940 births
Living people
People from Wetumka, Oklahoma
Washington Huskies football players
Philadelphia Eagles players
American football offensive guards
Players of American football from Oklahoma